Lecithocera pauperella is a moth in the family Lecithoceridae. It was described by Rebel in 1917. It is found in Egypt and Sudan.

The wingspan is about 9.5 mm. The forewings are brownish-grey without markings. The hindwings are light grey.

References

Moths described in 1917
pauperella